Eugene J. "Gene" Ovesen (July 4, 1928 - May 1, 2019) was an American curler from Superior, Wisconsin.

Teams

References

External links
 
Curling Superiority!: A History of Superior Wisconsin's Championship Curling Club - Google Books (p. 49) (look at "Gene Oveson")

2019 deaths
American male curlers
American curling champions
1928 births
Sportspeople from Superior, Wisconsin